The Mexican professional wrestling promotion Consejo Mundial de Lucha Libre (CMLL) has held the La Copa Junior ("The Junior Cup") tournament on an infrequent schedule since 1996. The tournament pays respect to the fact that wrestling is a family tradition in Lucha libre, with many second or even third-generation wrestlers following the footsteps of their relatives. So far CMLL has held ten tournaments starting in 1996 and then intermittently since 2005. While most of the family relationships are real there are a few instances of the family relationship being a storylines family relationship, such as Dragón Rojo Jr. being billed as the grandson of Dragón Rojo, when in reality that is simply a storyline created by CMLL.

The oldest tournament winner was Emilio Charles Jr., who was 39 years old when he won the 1996 tournament, while the oldest competitor ever was Brazo de Plata who was 51 years old when he wrestled in the 2014 VIP tournament. The youngest tournament winner was La Sombra, who won the 2012 tournament at 23 years of age. Cachorro or Mano Negra Jr. is the youngest wrestler to compete in the tournament, both were around 16 or 17 years old when they completed in the La Copa Junior tournament, but their actual birth date is not known, just birth year, making it impossible to determine who was the youngest entrant overall.

La Copa Junior winners

References

 
Lucha libre
Events in Mexico City
Recurring events established in 1996